Stiller is the surname of:

 Ben Stiller (born 1965), American actor, son of Jerry Stiller
 Bonner L. Stiller (born 1956), American politician and attorney
 Brian Stiller (born 1942), Canadian evangelical Protestant
 Cheynee Stiller, Australian rules footballer
 Eric Stiller, American author and kayaker
 Jerry Stiller (1927–2020), American comedian and actor, father of Ben Stiller
 Mauritz Stiller (1883–1928), Finnish film director and actor
 Robert Stiller (born 1928), Polish polyglot and translator
 Hannes Stiller (born 1978), Swedish footballer

See also
Stiler, surname

German-language surnames
Jewish surnames
Surnames from given names